The 2001 San Marino Grand Prix (formally the Gran Premio Warsteiner di San Marino 2001) was a Formula One motor race held at the Autodromo Enzo e Dino Ferrari, Imola, Emilia-Romagna, Italy on 15 April 2001. It was the fourth race of the 2001 Formula One season. The 62-lap race was won by Ralf Schumacher driving a Williams-BMW after starting from third position. David Coulthard, who started the Grand Prix from pole position, finished second in a McLaren-Mercedes, while Rubens Barrichello finished third in a Ferrari. Schumacher's win was the first of his Formula One career and the first for Williams since Jacques Villeneuve won the 1997 Luxembourg Grand Prix. The race also represented the first win for French tyre manufacturer Michelin in Formula One since the 1984 Portuguese Grand Prix and the first race since the 1998 Italian Grand Prix not won by Bridgestone.

Second place put Coulthard level on points with Ferrari driver Michael Schumacher in the Drivers' Championship, with both drivers on 26 points after Schumacher retired from the race. In the Constructors' Championship, McLaren reduced Ferrari's lead to 10 points. This was the last race for Gastón Mazzacane.

This event also marked the last time until the 2008 Australian Grand Prix that cars competed without using traction control, which was reintroduced at the next race, and the last race until the 2004 Australian Grand Prix not to feature cars competing with fully-automatic gearboxes and launch control, which were also reintroduced at the next race. These electronic driver aids were reintroduced to ensure no teams were using these systems illegally to gain a competitive advantage.

Background
Heading into the 4th race of the season, Ferrari driver Michael Schumacher was the leading the Drivers' Championship with 26 points; McLaren driver David Coulthard was second on 20 points, six points behind Schumacher. Behind Schumacher and Coulthard in the Drivers' Championship, Schumacher's teammate Rubens Barrichello was third on 10 points, in a Ferrari and Sauber driver Nick Heidfeld was fourth with 7 points. In the Constructors' Championship, Ferrari was leading with 36 points, 15 points ahead of McLaren. Sauber was third with 8 points.

Qualifying
Saturday qualifying would only run in one hour with the air temperature at 10–11°C (50–57°F) and the track temperature at 19–20°C (66–68°F) with partly cloudy conditions. Coulthard took pole position, two-tenths of a second ahead of teammate Mika Häkkinen, and half a second ahead of Ralf Schumacher in the Williams. The two Ferraris of Michael Schumacher and Barrichello qualified 4th and 6th, being split by Jarno Trulli's Jordan. The other Williams of Juan Pablo Montoya was seventh, and Kimi Räikkönen rounded out the top ten in his Sauber.

Qualifying classification

Race
Ralf Schumacher beat the two McLarens off the line to lead into the first corner, with Coulthard remaining ahead of Häkkinen. There was an investigation for jump starts, with Ralf, Coulthard and the BAR of Olivier Panis all being suspected of crawling at the start, but no action was taken against any of the drivers.

On lap 5, Fernando Alonso suffered brake failure, his Minardi bouncing over the Variante Alta chicane and into the wall. One lap later, Jos Verstappen crawled to a halt at the Villeneuve chicane with a broken exhaust on his Arrows. Panis was ahead of both Ferraris for a few laps until Barrichello passed the French driver at the Rivazza double left-hander. Shortly after, Michael Schumacher passed him and moved into 7th place. On lap 17, Räikkönen's steering arm broke just after the Tosa hairpin, which forced his Sauber into the wall.

Michael Schumacher picked up a puncture on his left front tyre on lap 20, causing him to pit. He continued, but came straight back into the pits due to a damaged suspension, possibly caused by an incident in the first few laps when he rammed a kerb too aggressively. Ralf Schumacher, Coulthard, Montoya and Gastón Mazzacane pitted on laps 27–28; Häkkinen made his first stop shortly after, along with Barrichello.

Mazzacane and Jacques Villeneuve retired with engine failures on laps 29–30. Giancarlo Fisichella's Benetton and Eddie Irvine's Jaguar also suffered engine failures, Fisichella in the pits on lap 31 and Irvine on the start-finish straight on lap 43. Meanwhile, Häkkinen was failing to catch Barrichello, doing slower laps. Montoya pitted on lap 47 only to stall his engine; after it had been restarted, he burned his clutch leaving the pits, forcing him to retire. At the same time, Ralf and Häkkinen made their final pit stops.

The Minardi team's race ended when Tarso Marques' engine blew up with just 12 laps to go, just after the pit entrance on the start-finish straight. The marshals put out the fire, and within a few minutes, had already helped pushed the car away.

With eight laps to go, Ralf Schumacher was shown "Oil Pump" on his pitboard, possibly meaning that his oil pressure was slowly falling, and Coulthard began to close up to the Williams at a rate of a few tenths per lap. Ralf managed to hold the McLaren off and take the victory, four seconds ahead. Barrichello finished third but over 30 seconds behind Coulthard; he held off Häkkinen for the last podium place. Trulli finished fifth, the last driver on the lead lap, while Jordan teammate Heinz-Harald Frentzen took the final point. Ralf also set a new lap record, his fastest lap of 1:25.524 being 0.999 seconds faster than the previous year's fastest lap, set by Häkkinen.

Nick Heidfeld's Sauber was 7th, Panis was 8th, and Jean Alesi was 9th in the Prost-Acer. Enrique Bernoldi was 10th in the second Arrows, Luciano Burti 11th in the second Jaguar, and Jenson Button the 12th and last finisher in the second Benetton, two laps behind Ralf.

Post-race
Ralf Schumacher's win meant that two brothers had won a Formula One race for the first time. It was also the first victory for BMW since joining the Williams team as an engine supplier. This also turned out to be Gastón Mazzacane's last Formula One race (and last World Championship Grand Prix to date for an Argentine driver), as he would be sacked by Alain Prost and replaced by Luciano Burti from the Spanish Grand Prix onwards, Burti himself having been sacked by Jaguar and replaced by Pedro de la Rosa.

Race classification 
Drivers who scored championship points are denoted in bold.

Championship standings after the race

Drivers' Championship standings

Constructors' Championship standings

 Note: Only the top five positions are included for both sets of standings.

References

San Marino Grand Prix
San Marino Grand Prix
San Marino Grand Prix
April 2001 sports events in Europe